Ahırlı is a town and district of Konya Province in the Central Anatolia region of Turkey. According to 2000 census, population of the district is 14,254 of which 800 live in the town of Ahırlı.

Notes

References

External links
 District governor's official website 

Populated places in Konya Province
Districts of Konya Province
Towns in Turkey